Absolutego is the debut studio album by Japanese experimental band Boris. It was released in 1996 by Fangs Anal Satan. This album shows inspiration from the Melvins and, most prominently, Earth. Excluding the Merzbow collaboration Sun Baked Snow Cave, it is the only "one-long-song" Boris album that is not broken down into multiple parts. A song with the same title also appears in the album Dear.

In 2001 Southern Lord Records re-released this album remastered and slowed down, with an alternative cover, and relabeled as Absolutego+ (Special Low Frequency Version) in homage to Earth 2. This reissue included a bonus drone track recorded in 1997; its title would be reused 4 years later for an album also called Dronevil (a trend which continued with three albums titled Heavy Rocks, one in 2002, another in 2011, and a third in 2022) as well as for the original "Dronevil" song, a Heavy Rocks (2002) outtake released on the Mangrove 2002 compilation. Southern Lord also released the 2001 remaster on vinyl in 2011 with new artwork, splitting the title track arbitrarily with cutoffs to fill the first three sides; the fourth side contains the final 9:35 and bonus track "Dronevil 2."

Track listing

Personnel
On all releases until Amplifier Worship, Takeshi had been referred to as "Ohtani", and was credited as such on Absolutego's original release. This was corrected for the reissue of the album.

 Atsuo – vocals, drums 
 Takeshi – bass
 Wata – guitars
 Nagata – drums
 Kakinuma – engineer
 Boris – production
 Just Play Design Uechi – artwork and typography

Pressing History

References

External links
 

1996 debut albums
Boris (band) albums
Southern Lord Records albums